Mark Lawson (born December 17, 1978) is an American actor known for portraying Brody Lovett on the ABC soap opera One Life to Live.

Early life
Lawson grew up in Bristol, Virginia, and later studied at the Boston Conservatory, where he earned his BFA in musical theatre, and London Academy of Music and Dramatic Art.

Career
Lawson's first role was as Jerry Stone in the 2005 Cold Case episode "Yo, Adrian". After five years in Los Angeles, he was about to give up on acting when he landed the role of ex-Navy SEAL Brody Lovett on the ABC soap opera One Life to Live and moved to New York in March 2008. Lawson played the character until the series ended in 2012. In July 2019, Lawson began appearing as Dustin Phillips on General Hospital.

Lawson is also a personal trainer and runs a strength and conditioning business, called Forge.

Filmography

Television

References

External links

Brody Lovett/Mark Lawson Biography - ABC.com
Mark Lawson Talks About His Daytime Emmy Pre-Nom - Soaps.com

1979 births
Living people
Male actors from Virginia
American male soap opera actors